The Chinese Cultural Garden is a  section of Overfelt Gardens, in San Jose, California, located in East San Jose. The addition of the Chinese Cultural Garden to Overfelt is primarily the work of Chinese immigrant Frank Lowe, his wife Pauline (who serves as park docent), and Dr. Chen Li-Fu of Taiwan.

Features and events
Features include an ornamental Friendship Gate, the Sun Yat-Sen Memorial Hall, the Chiang Kai-shek Pavilion, a large statue of Confucius, the Plum Pavilion, a sundial, and a carved, 15 ton black marble stone, mined and shipped from the Republic of China (Taiwan), donated by Tainan, one of San Jose's sister cities.

Materials, including 500-year-old juniper wood, were sourced from China. The characters written above the central portal are read right to left as: .

The Sun Yat-sen Memorial Hall is constructed from marble, bronze, and mahogany and was built in Taiwan, disassembled, then shipped and reassembled in San Jose. It features a ceramic tile roof weighing almost twenty tons.

The large black stone is a gift from Tainan and is at least one million years old. It was placed in Overfelt Gardens on 10 October 1980, marking the Chinese day of independence from Imperial rule.

On the third Sunday of September, the park celebrates the Chinese Moon Festival. It is primarily an event to showcase Asian performing arts, but also has arts and crafts for children and promotional booths from non-profit organizations, such as Cityteam and the San José Police Department.

Gallery

References

City of San Jose Department of Parks, Recreation and Neighborhood Services Overfelt Gardens brochure, March 2001 revision

External links
 Chinese Cultural Garden homepage
 
 
 
 

Chinese-American culture in California
Parks in San Jose, California